San Carlos Sija is a municipality in Quetzaltenango department of Guatemala.

External links 
 Municipalidad de San Carlos Sija
 San Carlos Sija Guatemala Travel Guide

Municipalities of the Quetzaltenango Department